Daba (also known as Dabba) is a Chadic dialect cluster spoken in Cameroon in Far North Province and in one village in neighboring Nigeria. Blench (2006) considers Mazagway to be a dialect.

Daba is spoken throughout the northern part of the Mayo-Louti department in the Northern Region (in Mayo-Oulo commune), extending slightly into Mayo-Tsanaga Department (in Hina and Bourrha communes) and Diamaré Department (Ndoukoula commune in the Far North Region). Daba (Kanakana), the most western variety that is isolated from the rest of the dialects, is spoken in Douroum, in the northern part of the Mayo-Oulo commune and in the Garoua Daba area (enclave of Hina commune) and in Bourrha commune. Tpala, in the northeast, is spoken in the Ndoukoula area.

Notes

References
 J. Mouchet.  1966.  Le parler daba:  esquisse grammaticale.  Yaounde:  Institut de Recherches Scientifiques du Cameroun.

Biu-Mandara languages
Languages of Cameroon
Languages of Nigeria